is a passenger railway station in located in the town of Taiki, Watarai District, Mie Prefecture, Japan, operated by Central Japan Railway Company (JR Tōkai).

Lines

Station layout
The station consists of a single island platform. There is no station building, but only a small rain shelter on the platform. The station is unattended.

Platforms

History
Umegatani Station opened on 27 February 1965 as a signal stop on the Japan National Railways (JNR) Kisei Main Line. It was upgraded in status to a full station on 1 November 1965. The station was absorbed into the JR Central network upon the privatization of the (JNR) on 1 April 1987.

Passenger statistics
In fiscal 2019, the station was used by an average of 17 passengers daily (boarding passengers only).

Surrounding area
The station is a mountainous area with the Narisaka Pass on the south side. The Kisei Main Line crosses the Kii-Nagashima Pass between this station and Kii-Nagashima Station, which was the border between Ise and Kii.
The east side of the station faces Japan National Route 42, and villages are scattered along the national highway. This station is the starting point for the Kumano Kodo Iseji Narisaka Pass and Tsuzurato Pass routes, and some of the limited express "Nanki" will stop as a temporary stop.

See also
List of railway stations in Japan

References

External links

 JR Central timetable 

Railway stations in Japan opened in 1965
Railway stations in Mie Prefecture
Taiki, Mie